Jean-Luc Schneider (born 18 September 1959) is the Chief Apostle of the New Apostolic Church. He succeeded Wilhelm Leber on 19 May 2013 to become the ninth Chief Apostle of the New Apostolic Church. Jean-Luc Schneider is the first Frenchman to lead the New Apostolic Church.

Early life

Jean-Luc Schneider was born into a New Apostolic family on 18 September 1959, the eldest of three children. In 1983 he married his wife Pascale and they have two daughters.
He and his wife live in a part of metropolitan Strasbourg, North-Eastern France.

As a young man he studied at a management school. Employed by a French gas company after the completion of his military service in 1982. After working in various capacities within the company he was later appointed as manager in the Strategy and Finance department.

Ministerial timeline
Sub-deacon - 10 January 1980
Priest - 24 November 1985
Evangelist - 17 September 1989
Shepherd - 1 January 1993
District Elder - 14 November 1993
Apostle and District Apostle Helper - 22 June 2003
District Apostle - 26 September 2004
Chief Apostle Helper - 27 May 2012
Chief Apostle - 19 May 2013

As a District Elder he was placed in charge of youth care for France. As a District Apostle he was responsible for France, Burundi, Democratic Republic of Congo (southeastern part), Tahiti and New Caledonia.

References

1959 births
Living people
French Christian religious leaders
Clergy from Strasbourg
Members of the New Apostolic Church